Markville Secondary School (commonly known as MSS or Markville) is a public high school located in the community of Unionville within the city of Markham, Ontario, Canada. It is one of 32 high schools administered by the York Region District School Board.

History
Markville S.S. is located in an area that was developed by the Melchior Quantz family of Germany in the city of Markham who came to North America with William Berczy. The terrain map of 1860 shows five houses fronting on present day McCowan Road, all inhabited by members of the family, the senior member of which was George B. Quantz and his wife, Jane Bradburn. The original name given to the school was Quantztown Secondary School as well as Melchior Quantz High School around 1990, but this was later changed to Markville Secondary School because the school is located between the Towns of Markham and Unionville.

The school was not completed at the start of the school year of 1990, so students started the school year at Markham District High School.  Markville S.S. was officially opened in late fall of 1990. The school opened with Grades 9, 10, and some Grade 11 students, with Grades 11 and 12 age students being allowed stay at either Unionville High School or Markham District High School.  In 1996, an addition to the third floor provided a new math and computer wing.

A child-care centre, Markville Child Care Centre, is operated by Family Day Care Services.

Academics

History
As of 2009, teachers Adrienne Chong, Rob Cotey and Mark Melnyk have received the Prime Minister's Awards for Teaching Excellence. They teach Canadian and World History, World Politics, Genocide and Crimes Against Humanity, World History to the End of the 15th Century, Honours Thesis, and World Religions through grades 10 to 12.

Music
Each year, the music students of Markville compete in several music festivals. These include the OBA (Ontario Band Association), Kiwanis Music Festival, and Music Alive. In addition, two concerts are held at the Markham Theatre. "Festive Sounds" is held in winter, and "Markville Pops" is held in the spring.

Markville offers music courses for grades 9 through 12 including:

Concert Band/Strings
Symphonic Band/Strings
Senior Band/Strings
Senior String
Chamber Choir
Junior Choir
Senior Choir
Music Theatre
Music and Computers
Jazz Band/Choir
Keyboard Class
Guitar Class

Ranking
Markville Secondary School is ranked number #2 among high/secondary schools in Ontario, based on the Fraser Ranking System (from Simon Fraser University in British Columbia).

Peer tutoring
Markville students volunteer to tutor others in subjects such as French and math. Through this program, peer tutors receive volunteer hours which are required in order to graduate from high school.

Feeder schools
Central Park Public School
James Robinson Public School
Ramer Wood Public School
Unionville Public School
Unionville Meadows Public School.

Gifted students who reside west of McCowan Road can also attend Markville Secondary School.

Notable alumni
Jason Chan, Hong Kong Canto-pop singer
Janet Chow, Miss Hong Kong First-Runner Up, 2006 and Hong Kong television actress
Karl Ting, Mister Hong Kong First-Runner Up, 2016
Julie Hastings, curler

See also
List of high schools in Ontario

References

York Region District School Board
High schools in the Regional Municipality of York
Buildings and structures in Markham, Ontario
Educational institutions established in 1990
1990 establishments in Ontario